La Blouse Roumaine is an oil-on-canvas painting by Henri Matisse from 1940. It measures 92 × 73 cm and is held at the Musée National d'Art Moderne in Paris.

The inspiration for the painting seems to have been Elvira Popescu, Elena Văcărescu, Anna de Noailles and Marthe Bibesco.

References

External links 
 Reproduction and essay

1940 paintings
Paintings by Henri Matisse
Paintings in the collection of the Musée National d'Art Moderne